Xanthopimpla punctata, also known as the yellow ichneumon wasp, is a yellow-colored Ichneumon wasp of subfamily Pimplinae. Xanthopimpla spp. play a beneficial role in agriculture. They are important parasitoids of lepidopterous stem borers of cereals, sugar cane and other crops; they lay their eggs on moth caterpillars that damage crops.

References

Pimplinae